The 2016 Copa do Nordeste was the 14th edition of the main football tournament featuring teams from the Brazilian Northeast Region. The competition featured 20 clubs, with Bahia and Pernambuco having three seeds each, and Ceará, Rio Grande do Norte, Sergipe, Alagoas, Paraíba, Maranhão and Piauí with two seeds each. Santa Cruz (Pernambuco) qualified to play in the 2016 Copa Sudamericana, after winning the final against Campinense (Paraíba) 3–2 on aggregate.Santa Cruz also qualified to play in the 2017 Copa Sudamericana but CONMEBOL reduced the Brazilian berths from 8 to 6. Therefore, the champions Santa Cruz (Copa do Nordeste) and Paysandu (Copa Verde) lost their Copa Sudamericana berths. Finally, they qualified for the 2017 Copa do Brasil Round of 16.Ceará were the defending champion, but were eliminated by Santa Cruz in the quarterfinals.

Qualified teams

Group stage

Group A

Source:CBF

Group B

Source:CBF

Group C

Source:CBF

Group D

Source:CBF

Group E

Source:CBF

Ranking of second placed teams

Knockout phase

Bracket

Quarterfinals

|}

Semifinals

|}

Finals

Top scorers

References

2016 domestic association football cups
Copa do Nordeste
2016 in Brazilian football